Metronomy Forever is the sixth studio album by English electronic music band Metronomy, released on 13 September 2019 by Because Music.

Critical reception

Metronomy Forever received generally positive reviews from music critics. At Metacritic, which assigns a normalised rating out of 100 to reviews from mainstream publications, the album received an average score of 78, based on 15 reviews.

Accolades

Track listing
All tracks are written and produced by Joseph Mount, except where noted.

Notes
  signifies an additional producer

Personnel
Credits adapted from the liner notes of Metronomy Forever.

 Joseph Mount – production ; mixing 
 Ash Workman – mixing ; additional production 
 Anna Prior – backing vocals 
 Jamie Snell – mixing 
 Pierre Rousseau – additional production 
 Mr. Oizo – additional production 
 Dave Fridmann – mixing 
 Oscar Cash – production, mixing 
 Matt Colton – mastering
 Anne Zeum – artwork
 Aaron Larney – layout
 Grégoire Alexandre – photography

Charts

References

2019 albums
Because Music albums
Metronomy albums